James Bernard Clark (25 September 1910 – 21 January 2003), known as Bernard Clark, was a New Zealand cricketer. He played three first-class matches for Otago between 1933 and 1935.

Clark was born at Dunedin in 1910 and educated at Otago Boys' High School. His father, James Clark Baker, played for Otago from 1890 to 1907. Clark died at Auckland in 2003; following his death obituaries were published in the New Zealand Cricket Annual and by Wisden.

References

External links
 

1910 births
2003 deaths
New Zealand cricketers
Otago cricketers
Cricketers from Dunedin